Homoloidea is a superfamily of dromiacean crabs.  Homoloidea belongs the group Dromiacea, taxonomically ranked as a section, and is the sister group to Dromioidea.  Dromiacea is the most basal grouping of Brachyura crabs, and likely diverged from the rest of Brachyura around the Late Triassic or Early Jurassic.  The close relation between Homoloidea and Dromioidea is primarily established through ultrastructural characteristics of the sperm.

The below cladogram shows Homoloidea's placement within Dromiacea:

Recent studies have found that the Homoloidea family Homolidae is paraphyletic with respect to Latreilliidae.

See also
Homola barbata

References

Dromiacea
Taxa named by Wilhem de Haan
Arthropod superfamilies